The 1982–83 season was Fulham's 88th as a professional club in the Football League. They competed in the Second Division and narrowly missed out on a second consecutive promotion following an infamous defeat at Derby County in their final match.

Season summary

For much of the season, the prospect of back-to-back promotions for Fulham was a serious possibility. At the start of 1983, they were in third place behind Wolverhampton Wanderers and Queens Park Rangers, and were seven points clear of fourth-placed Leicester City with a game in hand by the end of March.

However, successive defeats to Leicester, Sheffield Wednesday and QPR saw Fulham drop out of the promotion places for the first time since November. Going into their final match of the season at relegation-threatened Derby, they were level on points with Leicester but with an inferior goal difference, their destiny now out of their hands.

While Leicester were being held to a goalless draw at home by Burnley, Fulham fell behind to a 71st-minute goal by Bobby Davison. The final minutes were played out amid chaotic scenes with Derby supporters lining the pitch, many spilling on to the playing area, and a full scale pitch invasion greeted what appeared to be the final whistle. It later transpired referee Ray Chadwick had actually blown for an offside decision and there were still 78 seconds to go, but there was little hope of the match restarting.

Fulham manager Malcolm Macdonald immediately called for the match to be replayed and the club lodged an official appeal on the following Monday, which was rejected by the Football League. A further appeal against this decision also failed, ending Fulham's hopes of returning to the First Division for the first time since 1968.

Squad
Substitute appearances indicated in brackets

Second Division

Results

Second Division

Milk Cup

FA Cup

References

Bibliography
 

1982–83 in English football
Fulham F.C. seasons
English football clubs 1982–83 season